Zayakoshye is a rural locality (a village) in Malechkinskoye Rural Settlement, Cherepovetsky District, Vologda Oblast, Russia. The population was 1 as of 2002.

Geography 
Zayakoshye is located 16 km north of Cherepovets (the district's administrative centre) by road. Dementyevo is the nearest rural locality.

References 

Rural localities in Cherepovetsky District